Cárcamo is a surname. Notable people with the surname include:

Celes Ernesto Cárcamo (1903–1990), Argentine psychiatrist
Gabriel Cárcamo (born 1987), Chilean footballer
Juan Manuel Cárcamo (born 1974), Honduran footballer
Leonel Cárcamo (born 1965), Salvadoran footballer
Martín Cárcamo (born 1975), Chilean television presenter and actor